The 1924 Tipperary Senior Hurling Championship was the 33rd staging of the Tipperary Senior Hurling Championship since its establishment by the Tipperary County Board in 1887.

Boherlahan won the championship after an 8–03 to 1–00 defeat of a Mid Selection in the final. It was their sixth championship title overall and their first title since 1922.

References

Tipperary
Tipperary Senior Hurling Championship